Camel Group  is a Chinese battery recycling and manufacturing company. It is one of the largest car battery manufacturers in the world.

In 2017, the company invested 30 million EUR through IJNR Investments inc in Rimac Automobili, a Croatian supercar maker. Both companies are jointly pursuing the construction of a factory in Xiangyang for propulsion systems for electric vehicles.

References

External links
Camel Group Website
LiFePO4 Batteries Info

Battery manufacturers
Companies listed on the Shanghai Stock Exchange
Companies based in Hubei
Xiangyang